Károly Gaál (born 14 March 1954) is a Hungarian wrestler. He competed in the men's Greco-Roman 68 kg at the 1980 Summer Olympics.

References

External links
 

1954 births
Living people
Hungarian male sport wrestlers
Olympic wrestlers of Hungary
Wrestlers at the 1980 Summer Olympics
Martial artists from Budapest